Ivan Kvesić (born 13 October 1996) is a Croatian karateka athlete who won a gold medal at the 2018 World Karate Championships held in Madrid, Spain. He represented Croatia at the 2020 Summer Olympics in Tokyo, Japan. He competed in the men's +75 kg event.

Career 

In 2021, he lost his bronze medal match in the men's 84 kg event at the World Karate Championships held in Dubai, United Arab Emirates.

He won one of the bronze medals in the men's 84 kg event at the 2022 Mediterranean Games held in Oran, Algeria. He lost his bronze medal match in the men's kumite 84 kg event at the 2022 World Games held in Birmingham, United States.

Personal life 

His brother Anđelo Kvesić also competes in karate.

Achievements

References

External links
 
 

1996 births
Living people
Place of birth missing (living people)
Croatian male karateka
Karateka at the 2019 European Games
European Games medalists in karate
European Games gold medalists for Croatia
Croats of Bosnia and Herzegovina
People from Široki Brijeg
Karateka at the 2020 Summer Olympics
Olympic karateka of Croatia
Competitors at the 2022 Mediterranean Games
Mediterranean Games bronze medalists for Croatia
Mediterranean Games medalists in karate
Competitors at the 2022 World Games
21st-century Croatian people